Asemonea is a genus of jumping spiders that was first described by Octavius Pickard-Cambridge in 1869.

Species
 it contains twenty-three species, native to Asia and Africa. One species has been introduced to Queensland:
Asemonea amatola Wesolowska & Haddad, 2013 – South Africa
Asemonea bimaculata Dierkens, 2014 – Comoros, Mayotte
Asemonea clara Wesolowska & Haddad, 2013 – South Africa
Asemonea crinita Wanless, 1980 – Ivory Coast
Asemonea cristata Thorell, 1895 – Myanmar
Asemonea cuprea Wesolowska, 2009 – Zambia
Asemonea fimbriata Wanless, 1980 – Angola
Asemonea flava Wesolowska, 2001 – Kenya
Asemonea liberiensis Wanless, 1980 – Liberia
Asemonea maculata Wanless, 1980 – Ivory Coast
Asemonea minuta Wanless, 1980 – Angola
Asemonea murphyae Wanless, 1980 – Kenya, South Africa
Asemonea ornatissima Peckham, Peckham & Wheeler, 1889 – Madagascar
Asemonea pallida Wesolowska, 2001 – Kenya
Asemonea pinangensis Wanless, 1980 – Malaysia
Asemonea pulchra Berland & Millot, 1941 – West, Central Africa
Asemonea serrata Wesolowska, 2001 – Kenya
Asemonea sichuanensis Song & Chai, 1992 – China
Asemonea stella Wanless, 1980 – Kenya, Tanzania, South Africa. Introduced to Australia (Queensland)
Asemonea tanikawai Ikeda, 1996 – Japan (Okinawa)
Asemonea tenuipes (O. Pickard-Cambridge, 1869) (type) – India, Sri Lanka to Thailand
Asemonea trispila Tang, Yin & Peng, 2006 – China
Asemonea virgea Wesolowska & Szűts, 2003 – Congo

References

External links

 Photograph of A. tenuipes

Salticidae
Salticidae genera
Spiders of Africa
Spiders of Asia
Taxa named by Octavius Pickard-Cambridge